Katarzyna Pawlik (born 17 February 1989) is a former butterfly, freestyle and medley Polish Paralympic swimmer who competed in international level events.

References

1989 births
Living people
Sportspeople from Bytom
People from Chorzów
Paralympic swimmers of Poland
Polish female butterfly swimmers
Polish female freestyle swimmers
Polish female medley swimmers
Swimmers at the 2004 Summer Paralympics
Swimmers at the 2008 Summer Paralympics
Swimmers at the 2012 Summer Paralympics
Medalists at the 2004 Summer Paralympics
Medalists at the 2008 Summer Paralympics
Paralympic medalists in swimming
Paralympic gold medalists for Poland
Paralympic silver medalists for Poland
Paralympic bronze medalists for Poland
Medalists at the World Para Swimming Championships
S10-classified Paralympic swimmers
21st-century Polish women